Azovstal may refer to:

 Azovstal iron and steel works, a steel rolling company in Ukraine
 Azovstal railway station, a closed railway station
 FC Mariupol, a football club previously called "Azovstal"

See also

 Azov (disambiguation)
 Stal (disambiguation)